Shadows is Spy Glass Blue's first full-length studio album. It was first released in May, 1996 on Pinnacle Records. Its second release was in September, 1997 on Organic Records.

Track listing
 "Thin And Leaner"
 "Lodging"
 "In Sultry Places"
 "Can You Feel"
 "Me Mine"
 "On And On"
 "Stygian"
 "Iron Grey"
 "Ignorant Side"
 "Come Patmos"
 "Should Have"
 "Tell"

Personnel
Allan Aguirre: Vocals, Keyboard, Guitars, Percussion
River Tunnell: Bass Guitars
Kane Kelly: Guitar
Kris Rosentrater: Drums

References

External links
10 Reviews - hosted at spyglassblue.com

1996 albums